Andrei Radu may refer to:

Footballers
Andrei Radu (footballer, born 1996), Romanian defender
Ionuț Radu, Romanian goalkeeper also known as Andrei Radu